Gloucester Harbor is a late 19th-century painting by American artist William Morris Hunt. Done in oil on canvas, the impressionist painting depicts morning in the harbor of Gloucester, a major fishing port in New England. The painting was one of Hunt's first forays into the school of impressionism, and the creation of Gloucester Harbor and several other impressionism-inflected works sparked Bostonian interest in the impressionist movement. The painting is currently on display at the Museum of Fine Arts.

References 

1877 paintings
Paintings in the collection of the Museum of Fine Arts, Boston
Maritime paintings